This is a list of all teams and players who have been runners-up in the Cork Premier Senior Football Championship, and its preceding competition, since its inception in 1887.

By team

By year

References

List of Cork Senior Football Championship winners